Chthonerpeton noctinectes is a species of amphibian in the family Typhlonectidae, endemic to Brazil. Its natural habitats are subtropical or tropical seasonally wet or flooded lowland grassland, swamps, freshwater lakes, and pastureland.

Sources

noctinectes
Endemic fauna of Brazil
Amphibians of Brazil
Amphibians described in 2003
Taxonomy articles created by Polbot